TFSI may refer to:

 Turbo fuel stratified injection, a type of internal combustion engine
 Bistriflimide, bis(trifluoromethane)sulfonimide